
John B. Nicolson (1783 – November 9, 1846) was an officer in the United States Navy during the first half of the 19th century.

Nicolson was born in and a native of Richmond, Virginia. He entered the Navy as a midshipman on July 4, 1805. He served on the brig , commanded by Isaac Chauncey. Nicolson was promoted to lieutenant on May 20, 1812, while serving aboard the brig USS Flambeau, part of the Mediterranean Squadron during the Second Barbary War.

During the War of 1812, he served as fourth lieutenant aboard the  during the battle with HMS Macedonian. After the British vessel surrendered, Nicolson took Epervier back to the United States as a prize of war.

Nicolson was promoted to master commandant on March 5, 1817, and to captain on April 24, 1828. He was nominated by President Martin Van Buren to serve on the Board of Navy Commissioners, the administrative body which handled procurement and supply in the United States Department of the Navy. Nicolson, who filled the vacancy left by the death of Isaac Chauncey, served in the position from May 12, 1840, until April 29, 1841. As one of the Navy's most senior captains, Nicolson was known by the courtesy rank of commodore.

Nicolson died on November 9, 1846, at the age of 63. He is buried at the Congressional Cemetery in Washington, D.C.

References

Footnotes

Sources 

 
 US Navy Officers: 1798–1900 — "N" – Officers of the Continental and U.S. Navy and Marine Corps, 1775–1900. 7 April 2006. Naval Historical Center. Viewed 19 September 2006.
 Officers of the War of 1812 – Lieutenants . 11 May 1998. Naval Historical Center. Viewed 19 September 2006.
 Records of Boards and Commissions, 1812–90 , Inventory of the Naval Records Collection of the Office of Naval Records and Library, in Record Group 45. Located at the U.S. National Archives and Records Administration
 Journal of the executive proceedings of the Senate of the United States of America, 1837–1841, Tuesday, May 12, 1840. A Century of Lawmaking for a New Nation: U.S. Congressional Documents and Debates, 1774–1875. Library of Congress. Viewed 6 April 2006.
 Obituary of Commodore Nicolson from The National Intelligencer, Washington, D.C. (November 10, 1846). Historic Congressional Cemetery. Viewed 19 September 2006.
 Flanders, Alan. "Shipyard Commander was Hero in War of 1812. The Virginian-Pilot (Friday, December 29, 1995), p. 3. Online. Digital Library and Archives, Virginia Tech. Viewed 19 September 2006.

External links
John B. Nicolson Lunar Tables, 1826 MS 27 held by Special Collections & Archives, Nimitz Library at the United States Naval Academy

19th-century American naval officers
1783 births
1846 deaths
American military personnel of the Second Barbary War
United States Navy personnel of the War of 1812
American printers
Burials at the Congressional Cemetery
Date of birth uncertain
Military personnel from Richmond, Virginia
United States Navy commodores
19th-century American businesspeople